Anthony J. "Tony" Marsh (born May 26, 1954) is an American contemporary ceramic artist who lives and works in Long Beach, California.

Career
Marsh received a Bachelor of Fine Arts in 1978 from California State University Long Beach. From 1978 to 1981, Marsh studied as an apprentice under Japanese potter Shimaoka, in Mashiko, Japan. Marsh worked with Shimaoka's shokunin, or craftsmen, on a daily basis and was influenced by the traditional culture of the community, which differed from Marsh's experience of art-making in the United States. After leaving Japan, Marsh received a Master of Fine Arts degree in 1988 from New York State College of Ceramics at Alfred University. In 1989 Marsh was hired to teach at his undergraduate alma mater, Cal State Long Beach, where he continues to be a professor of art and head of the ceramics department.

Footnotes

Sources 
Marsh, Tony. "Art as Homage", Studio Potter 29, number 2.
Marsh, Tony. General Artist's Statement, December 2001.

Tony Marsh at Pierre Marie Giraud, Brussels
Tony Marsh at Hedge, San Francisco, CA

External links 

1954 births
Living people
Sculptors from California
California State University, Long Beach alumni
New York State College of Ceramics alumni
American ceramists
Artists from New York City
Sculptors from New York (state)